Dorian is a given name of Greek origin. In Greek, the meaning of the name Dorian is of Doris, a district of Ancient Greece, or of Dorus, a legendary Greek hero. Doros was the son of Helen of Sparta (who was the daughter of Zeus and Leda). Doros was the founder of the Dorian tribe. The Dorians were an ancient Hellenic tribe that is supposed to have existed in the north-eastern regions of Greece, ancient Macedonia and Epirus. Another possible origin is the Greek Dorios, meaning "child of the sea".

The name is linked to Dorothy, Theodore, Isidora, Dora, Doreen, Dorinda, and others. 

Notable people with the name "Dorian" include:

First name

A
Dorian Abbot, American geophysicist
Dorian Aldegheri (born 1993), French rugby union footballer
Dorian Allworthy, American painter
Dorian Andronic (born 1989), Romanian footballer
Dorian Auguiste (born 1980), Dominican-Virgin Island cricketer

B
Dorian Babunski (born 1996), Macedonian footballer
Dorian Bailey (born 1997), American soccer player
Dorian Baxter (born 1950), Canadian politician
Dorian Bertrand (born 1993), French footballer
Dorian Bevec (born 1957), German molecular biologist
Dorian Boccolacci (born 1998), French racing driver
Dorian Boguță (born 1971), Moldovan-Romanian actor
Dorian Boose (1974–2016), American football player
Dorian Brew (born 1974), American football player
Dorian Bylykbashi (born 1980), Albanian footballer

C
Dorian Caddy (born 1995), French footballer
Dorian Çollaku (born 1977), Albanian hammer thrower
Dorian Concept (born 1984), Austrian composer
Dorian Coninx (born 1994), French triathlete
Dorian Cooke (1916–2005), English intelligence officer
Dorian Corey (1937–1993), American drag performer

D
Dorian Daughtry (born 1967), American baseball player
Dorian Dervite (born 1988), French footballer
Dorian Descloix (born 1988), French tennis coach
Dorian Dessoleil (born 1992), Belgian footballer
Dorian Diring (born 1992), French footballer

E
Dorian Electra (born 1992), American singer-songwriter
Dorian Etheridge (born 1998), American football player

F
Dorian Finney-Smith (born 1993), American basketball player
Dorian FitzGerald (born 1975), Canadian artist
Dorian Foulon (born 1998), French cyclist
Dorian Fuller, American archaeologist

G
Dorian Godon (born 1996), French cyclist
Dorian M. Goldfeld (born 1947), American mathematician
Dorian Gray (disambiguation), multiple people
Dorian Gregory (born 1971), American actor

H
Dorian Haarhoff (born 1944), Namibian writer 
Dorian Hanza (born 2001), Spanish–Equatoguinean footballer
Dorian Harewood (born 1950), American actor
Dorian Harper (born 1982), Montserratian footballer
Dorian Hauterville (born 1990), French bobsledder
Dorian Healy (born 1962), British actor 
Dorian Holley (born 1956), American musician

J
Dorian James (born 1981), South African badminton player
Dorian Johnson (born 1994), American football player
Dorian Jones (born 1992), Welsh rugby union footballer

K
Dorian Keletela (born 1999), Congolese sprinter
Dorian Kërçiku (born 1993), Albanian footballer

L
Dorian Le Gallienne (1915–1963), Australian composer
Dorian Leigh (1917–2008), American model
Dorian Leljak, Serbian pianist
Dorian Lévêque (born 1989), French footballer
Dorian Lough (born 1966), English actor
Dorian Luccioni (born 2000), Computational Materials Researcher

M
Dorian Malovic, French journalist
Dorian Marin (born 1960), Romanian football coach
Dorian McMenemy (born 1996), Dominican swimmer
Dorian Missick (born 1976), American actor
Dorian Mortelette (born 1983), French rower

N
Dorian N'Goma (born 1988), Congolese footballer

O
Dorian O'Daniel (born 1994), American football player

P
Dorian Parker (1923/1924–2007), American politician
Dorian Paskowitz (1921–2014), American surfer 
Dorian Peña (born 1977), Filipino-American basketball player

R
Dorian Răilean (born 1993), Moldovan footballer
Dorian Rogozenco (born 1973), Romanian chess grandmaster
Dorian Rottenberg (1925–??), Russian translator
Dorian Rudnytsky (born 1944), American cellist

S
Dorian Scott (born 1982), Jamaican shot putter
Dorian Shainin (1914–2000), American management consultant
Dorian Smith (born 1985), American football player
Dorian Ștefan (born 1959), Romanian footballer

T
Dorian Thompson-Robinson (born 1999), American football player

U
Dorian Ulrey (born 1987), American runner

V
Dorian van Rijsselberghe (born 1988), Dutch windsurfer

W
Dorian Weber (born 1982), American rower
Dorian West (born 1967), British rugby union footballer
Dorian Williams (1914–1985), British equestrian
Dorian Williams (American football) (born 2001), American football player
Dorian Wilson (born 1964), American conductor
Dorian Wood (born 1975), American musician

Y
Dorian Yates (born 1962), British bodybuilder

Middle name
Alton Dorian Clark (born 1984), American musician and basketball coach
Max Dorian Fried (born 1994), American baseball pitcher
Noluthando Dorian Bahedile Orleyn (born 1956), South African lawyer and business executive
Adorjan Dorian Otvos (1893–1945), Hungarian-born Hollywood writer and composer

Surname
Armand Dorian (born 1973), American physician
Armen Dorian (1892–1915), Armenian poet
Charles Dorian (1891–1942), American actor
Emil Dorian (1893–1956), Romanian writer
Nancy Dorian (born 1936), American linguist
Paul Dorian, Canadian physician
Pierre Frédéric Dorian (1814–1873), French blacksmith
Shane Dorian (born 1972), American surfer
Steven Dorian (born 1977), American singer

Fictional characters
Dorian Gray, the protagonist of the novel The Picture of Dorian Gray by Oscar Wilde
Dorian Lord, on the American television series One Life to Live
Dorian Pavus, in the video game Dragon Age: Inquisition
Arno Dorian, in the video game series Assassin's Creed
Dorian Havilliard, in the book series Throne of Glass by Sarah J. Maas

Other uses
Dorian (disambiguation)
Dorrian (disambiguation)
Hurricane Dorian, a Category 5 Atlantic hurricane (2019)

See also
Dora (given name)
Dorien (given name)

References 

Given names
English masculine given names
Albanian masculine given names
Given names of Greek language origin
Romanian masculine given names
Unisex given names